WFA may refer to:
Women's Football Association, the body that regulated women's football in England from 1969 until 1993
Wilmington First Assembly, Pentecostal church located in Wilmington, Delaware, USA
Wilmington Football Association, later known as the Wilmington Football League, American football league from 1929 to 1955
Weapons Factory Arena, Quake III Arena class-based mod
Weight for Age, one of the conditions for a race in thoroughbred horse racing
Wellington Free Ambulance, service in New Zealand
Western Finance Association, finance society
Western Front Association, charity formed to maintain interest in the 1914-18 war
Wi-Fi Alliance, trade group promoting IEEE 802.11 equipment
Wilderness first aid, in the United States, the name of a certification in wilderness medicine
World Fantasy Award, international award for works of fantasy
World Federalist Association, former name of Citizens for Global Solutions
World Federation of Advertisers, global trade association for advertisers
World Federation for Animals
World Fighting Alliance, professional mixed martial arts organization
"We're from America", Marilyn Manson Song
Women's Football Alliance, American tackle football league
Woodie Flowers Award, a FIRST Robotics Competition award presented to mentors
Work From Anywhere, telecommuting